Ramapuram is a village in the Thanjavur taluk of Thanjavur district, Tamil Nadu, India.

Demographics 

As per the 2001 census, Ramapuram had a total population of 1466 with 729 males and 739 females. The sex ratio was 10:17, and the literacy rate was 78:12.

References 

 

Villages in Thanjavur district